Mahkonce is an unincorporated community in Clover and Twin Lakes Townships, Mahnomen County, Minnesota, United States.

Notes

Unincorporated communities in Mahnomen County, Minnesota
Unincorporated communities in Minnesota